Nymphulodes is a genus of moths of the family Crambidae. It contains only one species, Nymphulodes franciscalis, which is found in Brazil.

References

Natural History Museum Lepidoptera genus database

Acentropinae
Crambidae genera
Taxa named by George Hampson